Ihor Yaroslavovych Lahoyda (born 23 August 1978) is a Ukrainian football coach and a former player.

References

1978 births
Living people
Ukrainian footballers
FC Lviv (1992) players
FC Dynamo-2 Kyiv players
FC Dynamo-3 Kyiv players
FC Hoverla Uzhhorod players
FC Elista players
Ukrainian expatriate footballers
Expatriate footballers in Russia
Russian Premier League players
FC Zirka Kropyvnytskyi players
Ukrainian Premier League players
FC Zirka-2 Kirovohrad players
FC Polissya Zhytomyr players
FC Podillya Khmelnytskyi players
FC Inter Boyarka players
FC Yednist Plysky players
Ukrainian football managers

Association football defenders